Eulimella acicula is a species of sea snail, a marine gastropod mollusk in the family Pyramidellidae, the pyrams and their allies.

Description
The shell is rather thin, semitransparent, polished, glassy white in live, milk-white in dead specimens. Its length measures 4.3 mm. The teleoconch contains 8-9 narrow whorls, These are flattened with their periphery scarcely angulated.

Distribution
This species is common in the North Atlantic Ocean and in the Mediterranean Sea. It occurs in the following locations: at depths between 99 m and 550 m  
 Belgian Exclusive Economic Zone
 European waters (ERMS scope)
 Irish Exclusive Economic Zone
 Portuguese Exclusive Economic Zóne
 North West Coast of Apulea
 Spanish Exclusive Economic Zone
 United Kingdom Exclusive Economic Zone
 Greek Exclusive Economic Zone
 the Canary Islands

Notes
Additional information regarding this species:
 Synonymy: Synonymised with Eulimella laevis (Brown, 1827) 
 Monterosato had changed the name to Eulimella. commutata on account of Auricula acicula, Lam., a fossil species which is a very doubtful Eulimella. 
The species Eulimella commutata Monterosato, 1884 is now considered by van Aartsen a synonym of Eulimella acicula

References

 Ziegelmeier, E. (1966). Die Schnecken (Gastropoda Prosobranchia) der deutsche Meeresgebiete und brackigen Küstengewässer [The Gastropoda Prosobranchia from the German seas and brackish coastal waters]. Helgol. Wiss. Meeresunters. 13: 1-66
 Gofas, S.; Le Renard, J.; Bouchet, P. (2001). Mollusca. in: Costello, M.J. et al. (Ed.) (2001). European register of marine species: a check-list of the marine species in Europe and a bibliography of guides to their identification. Collection Patrimoines Naturels. 50: pp. 180–213.

External links
 To Biodiversity Heritage Library (67 publications)
 To CLEMAM
 To Encyclopedia of Life
 To Marine Species Identification Portal
 To World Register of Marine Species

acicula
Gastropods described in 1836